"Medusa" is the twelfth episode of the eighth season of the American science fiction television series The X-Files. The episode was written by Frank Spotnitz and directed by Richard Compton. "Medusa" is a "Monster-of-the-Week" story, unconnected to the series' wider mythology. The episode received a Nielsen rating of 8.2 and was viewed by 13.8 million viewers. Overall, the episode received mixed reviews from critics.

The series centers on FBI special agents Dana Scully (Gillian Anderson) and her new partner John Doggett (Robert Patrick)—following the alien abduction of her former partner, Fox Mulder (David Duchovny)—who work on cases linked to the paranormal, called X-Files. In this episode, a string of bizarre deaths in the tunnels of the Boston subway system sees Doggett join a team of professionals underground to investigate. Meanwhile, Scully has to defy the train authorities above ground, who are determined to get the trains up and running within hours.

"Medusa" was allotted a "huge budget", due mostly to the fact that a replica of the Boston subway had to be recreated. Robert Patrick later called the eventual set "the biggest damned thing I'd seen in my life." Cheri Montesanto-Medcalf and Matthew Mungle, the show's make-up effect producers, used several unorthodox ingredients to create the effect of melted flesh; in addition to the use of normal prosthetic make-up, the two also used a combination of figs and Fruit Roll-Ups.

Plot
In Boston, an undercover cop waits for the subway, alone. Suddenly, a suspicious man appears, jumping the fare barrier. Eventually, they both get onto a train and the police officer draws his gun as the man starts to walk towards him from behind. Suddenly, the subway comes to a screeching halt, flashes of light are seen, and the train loses power. Later, when the train is back up and running, a group of commuters board the subway car and find the undercover cop with the flesh on half his face and his left arm stripped down to the bone.

Agents Scully and Doggett arrive at the operations center to investigate. However, they are rudely greeted by Deputy Chief Karras and Lieutenant Bianco of the transit police; the two eagerly want the FBI to get the job done fast so that the system can be reopened in time for the evening rush hour, and Karras is also irritated that Scully performed an autopsy on the body. Even after an autopsy, Scully has no idea what killed the man, and the CDC is unable to find any biological or chemical agents in the subway.

Doggett and Scully are soon introduced to a strike force that will be going into the subway to investigate. The group includes Steven Melnick, a structural engineer, and Dr. Hellura Lyle, a CDC employee specializing in pathogens. Scully, however, decides the plan will work better if Doggett acts as her eyes and ears while she analyzes the situation from up in the Transit Control Center. Using cameras and microphones, she will watch and hear what is happening. After the plans are made, Doggett leads the team into the dark tunnel.

While in the tunnels, Melnick gets a burn on the back of his neck suggesting a chemical leak. However, the test of the nearby puddle shows nothing dangerous: it is just salt water. Melnick mentions that the tunnels run along the harbor in some places and that they get sea water leakages from time to time. Moving ahead, the team finds an abandoned section of subway tunnel. Out of the tunnel bursts a man with his rib cage and teeth exposed who knocks Doggett down: he is the suspected robber, eaten away like the other man. His condition proves that he did not kill the man and that there may, in fact, be a contagion. While looking around, the teams discover three bodies with the same gruesome injuries, wrapped in plastic. It soon becomes clear that someone is covering up the problem in the subway.

Lyle spots an unknown person running away from them in the subway and the team follows. When the group approaches the spot where the train lost power, Melnick starts crying out in pain. Visible electrical flashes start destroying the skin on his left arm. Scully tells Doggett to pour water on it, which stops the flashes. Lyle takes the badly injured Melnick to the surface and Doggett continues onward with Bianco. When Melnick returns to the surface, he seems to be getting worse, but Lyle appears healthy. Scully then sees the three bodies being taken away by non-CDC hazmat people. When Scully confronts Karras about this, he says that he is organizing it. Scully tells Karras that she has already organized the CDC to collect the bodies and accuses Karras of attempting a cover-up. Although Karras tries to deny his involvement, he eventually allows her to send the bodies to the actual CDC.

Back in the tunnels, Doggett notices a green glow on Bianco in a dimly lit former subway station. As such, he refuses to allow the lieutenant to leave. Bianco runs away, forcing Doggett to give chase. He learns from Scully that Karras has gone ahead of plan and allowed the system to resume operation, despite the danger. After analyzing various water samples found at the scene, Scully meets with Dr. Kai Bowe, a marine biologist, who explains that the sample contains a unique microscopic sea creature called a medusa which are made out of calcium and are bioluminescent. However, Bowe does not know why the electrical reaction happens. When Doggett finds the wounded Bianco, he finds that his condition has gotten worse. Doggett then carries Bianco on his back and helps him continue through the tunnels. They soon encounter a boy with no signs of the luminous green substance on him. Scully realizes that sweat is causing the chemical electrical reaction since it is conductive to calcium ions. The boy does not have well developed sweat glands yet so the medusas are not affecting him. Doggett follows the boy to a major leak from the bay with the green glow on all the walls. Suddenly, an oncoming train approaches the group. Doggett uses Bianco's gun as an electrical conductor from the third rail to the electrolytic water, killing the medusas and preventing further exposure.

Later, Scully comes to see Doggett in the hospital. She informs him that Bianco and Melnick are with plastic surgeons, the boy has been given to social services, and no criminal charges will be pressed against Karras since the electrical discharge from the third rail destroyed the proof of the medusas in the tunnel.

Production

"Medusa" was written by executive producer Frank Spotnitz and directed by Richard Compton. Reportedly, because of the scope of the episode, a "huge budget" was allotted for the entry. The subway set created for this episode was designed to mirror the actual Boston subway. According to co-star Robert Patrick, "They got us in there, and we did it, and they built a huge subway tunnel set on a soundstage." Patrick later described the set as "the biggest damned thing I'd ever seen in my life." In real life, the Boston subway system is "fondly" called the T, short for the Massachusetts Bay Transportation Authority. In "Medusa", the "T", was changed to an "M" "for fictional purposes".

Cheri Montesanto-Medcalf and Matthew Mungle, the show's make-up effect producers, used several unorthodox ingredients to create the effect of melted flesh; in addition to the use of normal prosthetic make-up, the two also used a combination of figs and Fruit Roll-Ups. Several of the characters in the episode were named after real-life individuals: First, the characters of Hellura Lyle and Kai Bowe were named after two Writers Guild trainees who served in The X-Files writing room. Second, the character Steven Melnick is named after the Vice President of Media Relations for 20th Century Fox Television. Melnick had formerly served as the publicist for the series.

Broadcast and reception
"Medusa" first aired on Fox on February 11, 2001. The episode earned a Nielsen household rating of 8.2, meaning that it was seen by 8.2% of the nation's estimated households. The episode was viewed by 8.27 million households, and 13.8 million viewers. The episode ranked as the 41st most-watched episode for the week ending February 11. The episode subsequently debuted in the United Kingdom on the BBC Two on May 26, 2002. Fox promoted the episode with the tagline "Underneath the street lies the ultimate in terror."

Critical reception to the episode was mostly mixed. Television Without Pity writer Jessica Morgan rated the episode a "B". Despite the moderate praise, however, Morgan did make a jest at the portrayal of the subway in the show, noting that it was not realistic; she wrote that the set was the "cleanest, emptiest subway station in world […] No urine. No trash. It's nicer than my apartment, really." Robert Shearman and Lars Pearson, in their book Wanting to Believe: A Critical Guide to The X-Files, Millennium & The Lone Gunmen gave the episode a mixed review and rated it two-and-a-half stars out of five. Despite writing that "on paper ['Medusa' is] the right episode at the right time", the two criticized the episode, noting that "the teaser never really makes sense in light of the relations offered, the appearance of the mute boy is a messy contrivance, and the ending is too abrupt."

Zack Handlen of The A.V. Club rated the episode a "B−". While noting that the episode possessed "a few decent ideas, and a wasted setting", the "story never sparks". He largely blamed the episode's antagonistic organism, noting that they are not "all that memorable" and "not even all that monster-y". Despite this, he wrote positively of the show's use of Scully, arguing that, "the fun of the episode is watching Scully watch Doggett and his team … slowly work through the closed off subway tunnels, finding bodies wrapped in plastic and other mysteries beside."

Paula Vitaris from Cinefantastique gave the episode a slightly negative review and rated it one-and-a-half stars out of four. Despite noting, "after episodes about butt-crawling and vomiting, it's a relief to have one in which people die when their skin and muscles are fried away by microscopic sea creatures called medusas", Vitaris was critical of the plot, likening it to "cliche[d]" 1970's movies that featured the "obstreperous official insisting the plane must fly or the skyscraper is fire-proof, even when the potential for catastrophe is staring him in the face." Spotnitz later admitted during a Reddit IAmA that the episode was his least-favorite that he had written because "the concept just wasn't clear or compelling enough to sustain the hour."

Notes

Footnotes

Bibliography

External links 

2001 American television episodes
Television episodes set in Boston
The X-Files (season 8) episodes
Underground railways in fiction